Jagdish Raj Khurana (1928 – 28 July 2013) was a Bollywood actor who holds a Guinness World Record for being the most type-cast actor. He played the role of a police inspector in 144 films.

Early life and career
He was born in 1928 in the town of Sargodha, British India, which is now in Pakistan. His daughter Anita Raj is also a Bollywood actress.

Jagdish Raj had the record of playing a police officer 144 times in various Bollywood films. Jagdish Raj Khurana also holds a Guinness World Record for being the most type-cast actor. He played a police inspector in 144 films.

Some of his popular movies include Deewar, Don, Shakti, Mazdoor, Imaan Dharam, Gopichand Jasoos, Silsila, Aaina and Besharam. He also played Aditya Pancholi's father in Naamcheen (1991). Although Raj occasionally played a villain and a couple of times played a judge, he was best known for being cast a record 144 times as a police officer. After Shafi Inamdar, he holds the Limca Book of Records record for Most memorable policeman ever.

Death

Raj died on 28 July 2013 at his Juhu residence following a respiratory ailment. He was 85 years old. He has two daughters, Anita Raj and Roopa Malhotra and a son named Bobby.

Selected filmography

Ek Hi Raasta (1939)
Seema (1955) - Doctor
Funtoosh (1956)
CID (1956) - Inspector Jagdish
12 O'Clock (1958) - Police Inspector Chauhan
Madhumati (1958) - Police Captain (uncredited)
Dhool Ka Phool (1959) - Prosecuting Attorney
Shararat (1959)
Kangan (1959) - Captain
Kanoon (1960) - Sub-Inspector Das
Honeymoon (1960)
Bahadur Lutera (1960)
Kala Bazar (1960)
Bombai Ka Babu (1960) - Bali
Modern Girl (1961) - Advocate
Dharmputra (1961)
Teen Ustad (1961)
Roop Ki Rani Choron Ka Raja (1961) - Jeweller
Pyaar Ka Saagar (1961) - Eye Surgeon Dr. Cooper
Passport (1961) - Police Inspector
Hum Dono (1961) - Jagdish
Tarzan Goes to India (1962) - Raj
Rocket Girl (1962)
Ek Mahal Ho Sapno Ka (1962) - Inspector Jagdish
Bombay Ka Chor (1962) - Police Inspector
Ankh Micholi (1962) - Inspector Jagdish
Nine Hours to Rama (1963) - Detective
Pyar Ka Bandhan (1963) - Jaggu
Kinare Kinare (1963) - Doctor (uncredited)
Ek Dil Sao Afsane (1963) - Sunita's Boss
Waqt (1965) - Police Inspector
Raaka (1965)
Bhoot Bungla (1965) - Police Inspector Sawant
Budtameez (1966) - Colonel Jung Bahadur
Hamraaz (1967) - Police Inspector Mhatre
Jewel Thief (1967) - Jewel Thief's associate
Jaal (1967)
Baazi (1968) - Blackmailer
Sunghursh (1968) - Raja Saheb
Neel Kamal (1968)
Duniya (1968) - Madan's associate
Parivar (1968) - Meena's Father
Jhuk Gaya Aasman (1968) - Police Inspector
Farishta (1968)
Abhilasha (1968) - Arun's Commanding Officer
Aanchal Ke Phool (1968) - Doctor at Government Hospital
The Killers (1969)
Aadmi Aur Insaan (1969) - Balwa (drunkard)
Ittefaq (1969) - Inspector Khan
Tumse Achha Kaun Hai (1969) - Police Inspector
Nanak Naam Jahaz Hai (1969) - Thanedaar
Kismat (1969) - Undercover Police Inspector
Jyoti (1969) - Dr. Verma
Ilzam (1970) - Jaggu
Sachaa Jhutha (1970) - Inspector. Jagdish
Johny Mera Naam (1970) - Police Inspector
The Evil Within (1970) - Yalid
Safar (1970) - Police Inspector
Pavitra Paapi (1970) - Police Inspector of Hoshiarpur (uncredited)
Ishq Par Zor Nahin (1970) - Rai
Bhai-Bhai (1970) - Diamond Auctioner
Mehboob Ki Mehndi (1971) - Nisar Ahmed / Usman
Upaasna (1971) - Police Inspector Verma
Elaan (1971) - Police Inspector
Patanga (1971) - Manoharlal
Memsaab (1971) - His Highness
Man Mandir (1971) - Kishan
Hum Tum Aur Woh (1971) - Inspector Surendra Mohan Khurana
Hulchul (1971)
Gambler (1971) - Inspector Ranade
Sanjog (1972) - Jagdish (Guest Appearance)
Dastaan (1972) - Mr. Shetty
Apradh (1972) - Customs Officer
Jawani Diwani (1972) - Mr. Sharma
Victoria No. 203 (1972) - Ranjeet (uncredited)
Jangal Mein Mangal (1972) - Senior Police Inspector
Yaar Mera (1972) - Jailor
Tanhai (1972) - Sethji / The Gambler
Tangewala (1972) - Police Inspector
Mangetar (1972)
Do Chor (1972) - Police Inspector
Babul Ki Galiyan (1972) - Police Inspector
Dhund (1973) - Inspector Bakshi
Daag (1973) - Ram Singh (driver) (uncredited)
Kuchhe Dhaage (1973) - Amrutlal
Dhamkee (1973)
Jheel Ke Us Paar (1973) - Police Inspector Saxena (uncredited)
Bobby (1973) - Police Inspector
Joshila (1973)
Teen Chor (1973)
Samjhauta (1973) - Police Inspector
Jalte Badan (1973) - Dr. Hussain
Hum Sab Chor Hain (1973) - Police Inspector Jagdish
Ghulam Begam Badshah (1973) - Card Player
Chalaak (1973) - Police Inspector
Blackmail (1973) - Mr. Das
Apradhi (1974) - Mahant Badriprasad
Dost (1974) - Police Inspector who paid visit to Mr. Gupta after Shyamal's death (uncredited)
Paap Aur Punya (1974) - Police Inspector
Chor Chor (1974) - Inspector
Anjaan Raahen (1974) - House Master
International Crook (1974) - Inspector Mario
Roti (1974) - Police Inspector
Benaam (1974) - Mr. Desai
Majboor (1974) - Police Inspector Kulkarni
Zehreela Insaan (1974) - Bidre
Jeevan Rekha (1974)
Insaaniyat (1974) - Police Inspector Ramesh
Har Har Mahadev (1974) - Tarkasur
Duniya Ka Mela (1974) - Sethji / Man who attempts raping Shyama
Chhote Sarkar (1974) - Jaggu
Chattan Singh (1974) - Thanedar
36 Ghante (1974) - Police Inspector S.P. Mathur
Veeru Ustaad (1975)
Warrant (1975)
Deewaar (1975) - Jaggi
Zorro (1975) - Hariprasad
Zameer (1975) - Sher Singh
Dharmatma (1975) - Dr. Jagdish
Ek Mahal Ho Sapno Ka (1975) - Pal
Dharam Karam (1975) - Inspector Nath
Saazish (1975) - Hunsui's doctor
Mutthi Bhar Chawal (1975)
Mere Sajna (1975)
Khel Khel Mein (1975) - Inspector (uncredited)
Do Jasoos (1975) - Police Inspector Solanki (uncredited)
Dharam Jeet (1975) - Inspector
Dafaa 302 (1975) - Satish 
Jaggu (1975)
Sawa Lakh Se Ek Ladaun (1976) - Subedar Ali Shah
Khaan Dost (1976) - Mohan
Jaaneman (1976) - Taxi driver
Fakira (1976) - Roshan
Bajrangbali (1976)
Laila Majnu (1976)
Do Anjaane (1976) - Doctor
Mazdoor Zindabaad (1976) - Inspector (uncredited)
Maha Chor (1976) - Inspector Jagdish Raj
Chalte Chalte (1976) - Inspector
Bhoola Bhatka (1976) - Senior Police Inspector
Immaan Dharam (1977) - Police Inspector
Dream Girl (1977)
Aaina (1977) - Managing Director (as Jagdishraj)
Karm (1977) - Khanna
Doosara Aadmi (1977) - Police Inspector
Tinku (1977) - Police Inspector
Ram Bharose (1977)
Paradh (1977)
Paapi (1977) - Inspector Bhaskar
Mama Bhanja (1977) - Police Inspector
Chaalu Mera Naam (1977) - Micheal
Chingari (1977)
Tyaag Patra (1978)
Rahu Ketu (1978) - Inspector Thakur
Vishwanath (1978) - Francis
Tumhari Kasam (1978) - Police Inspector (Uncredited)
Besharam (1978) - Pandey
Trishul (1978) - Police Inspector who arrested Balwant (uncredited)
Don (1978) - Fake Police Office
Azaad (1978) - Police Inspector Sharma
Phandebaaz (1978) - Police Inspector
Main Tulsi Tere Aangan Ki (1978) - Agarwal
Dil Aur Deewar (1978)
Sone Ka Dil Lohe Ke Haath (1978) - Police Inspector
Ram Kasam (1978)
Parmatma (1978) - Inspector
Karmayogi (1978)
Kaala Aadmi (1978)
Chor Ho To Aisa (1978) - Police Inspector
Anjaam (1978) - D.S.P.
Bhayaanak (1979) - Sadhu Singh
Dil Kaa Heera (1979) - Pilot
The Great Gambler (1979) - Nath
Magroor (1979) - Police Officer
Duniya Meri Jeb Mein (1979) - Supervisor
Kaala Patthar (1979) - Police Inspector
Bin Phere Hum Tere (1979) - Ganesh
Shuhaag (1979) - Police Inspector-Khan
Dhan Daulat (1980) - Police Inspector
Do Aur Do Paanch (1980) - Security guard (one in darker suit)
Khwab (1980) - Inspector Shinde
The Burning Train (1980) - Dango, Railway Engine Motorman
Chambal Ki Kasam (1980) - Zalim Singh's Gangman
Dostana (1980) - Driver (Daaga's man)
Insaf Ka Tarazu (1980) - Inspector
Zakhmon Ke Nishan (1980)
Yari Dushmani (1980) - Jailer
Pyaara Dushman (1980)
Patita (1980)
Bandish (1980)
Paanch Qaidi (1981) - Thanedaar
Ehsaan Aap Ka (1981) - Dr. Saxena
Krodhi (1981) - Police Inspector
Nakhuda (1981) - Police Inspector
Agnee Pareeksha (1981) - Police Inspector
Ladies Tailor (1981) - Police Inspector
Khoon Aur Paani (1981) - Johnny
Naseeb (1981) - Jaggi, the band musician
Silsila (1981)
Ek Hi Bhool (1981) - Ram's Firm Boss (Guest Appearance)
Shakka (1981) - Raghu
Fiffty Fiffty (1981) - Chandpur's Trustee
Gehra Zakhm (1981) - Police Inspector (uncredited)
Sheetla Mata (1981) - Sardar Phoolan
Sansani: The Sensation (1981) - Mr. Mathur
Raaz (1981) - Lawyer
Professor Pyarelal (1981)
Do Dishayen (1982) - Doctor 2
Aamne Samne (1982)
Teesri Aankh (1982) - Police Inspector
Desh Premee (1982) - Major B.K. Verma
Sawaal (1982) - Inspector Jagdish
Dil-E-Nadaan (1982)
Shakti (1982)
Deedar-E-Yaar (1982)
Raakh Aur Chingari (1982) - Manohar
Jeeo Aur Jeene Do (1982)
Dulha Bikta Hai (1982) - Advocate Defence Lawyer 
Do Ustad (1982)
Gopichand Jasoos (1982) - Verma
Hum Se Na Jeeta Koi (1983) - Police Chief
Taqdeer (1983) - Mr. Rai
Kaun? Kaisey? (1983) - Senior Police
Jeet Hamaari (1983) - Police Com. Saxena
Jaane Jaan (1983) - Police inspector
Naukar Biwi Ka (1983) - Police Inspector
Mazdoor (1983) - Tiwari, Bank Manager
Rishta Kagaz Ka (1983) - Aarti's dad
Kaise Kaise Log (1983)
Daulat Ke Dushman (1983) - Inspector Gopal
Bindiya Chamkegi (1984) - Jeevan
Inquilaab (1984) - I.G..P. Shamsher Singh - Delhi
Boxer (1984) - Man Whose Watch Gets Stolen
Hum Hain Lajawab (1984) - Khan Saab
Raj Tilak (1984) - King's Assailant
Laila (1984) - Thakur (Sunaina's Father)
Jeene Nahin Doonga (1984) - Jailor
Kasam Paida Karne Wale Ki (1984) - Prosecuting Attorney
The Gold Medal (1984) - Inspector Choudhary
Ram Tere Kitne Nam (1985) - Jailor
Aandhi-Toofan (1985) - I.G.P.
Arjun (1985) - Senior Police Officer
Yudh (1985) - Bhatnagar (Police Training Instructor, Special Appearances)
Sitamgar (1985) - Michael - bartender
Mehak (1985)
Ram Teri Ganga Maili (1985) - Police Inspector
Geraftaar (1985) - Inspector Samant
Jaan Ki Baazi (1985) - Commissioner
Zulm Ka Badla (1985) - Inspector / D.I.G. Verma
Salma (1985) - Doctor who checked Salma's throat
Phaansi Ke Baad (1985) - Inspector Bhagwat
Karishma Kudrat Kaa (1985) - Inspector General of Police
Bond 303 (1985) - Police inspector
Sasti Dulhan Mahenga Doolha (1986) - Mafatlal
Locket (1986)
Teesra Kinara (1986)
Mera Haque (1986) - Police Inspector
Chhota Aadmi (1986)
Bhai Ka Dushman Bhai (1986)
Loha (1987) - Police Commissioner
Aag Hi Aag (1987) - Judge
Mera Karam Mera Dharam (1987) - Police Inspector
Vishaal (1987) - Police Inspector
Khazana (1987) - Police Inspector
Inaam Dus Hazaar (1987) - Auctioneer
Sagar Sangam (1988) - S.P (Superident of Police)
Soorma Bhopali (1988)
Janam Janam (1988) - Sunil's Father
Do Waqt Ki Roti (1988) - Supdt. of Police
Meri Zabaan (1989)
Asmaan Se Ooncha (1989)
Nafrat Ki Aandhi (1989) - Police Commissioner
Do Yaar (1989)
Na-Insaafi (1989) - Police Commissioner
Aakhri Ghulam (1989) - Jailor
Oonch Neech Beech (1989) - Police Inspector
Toofan (1989) - IGP (uncredited)
Paap Ka Ant (1989) - Police Commissioner
Jeene Do (1990) - Sujata's dad
Baaghi (1990) - Police Commissioner (uncredited)
Roti Ki Keemat (1990) - Chief Commissioner of Police
Jawani Zindabad (1990) - Police Inspector (uncredited)
Aag Ka Gola (1990) - Police Commissioner
Begunaah (1991) - Police Inspector
Vishnu-Devaa (1991) - Police Commissioner
Yodha (1991) - Police Inspector Shinde
Paap Ki Aandhi (1991) - Senior Police Officer
Kasam Kali Ki (1991)
Love (1991)
Phool Bane Angaray (1991) - Commissioner Pandey
Naamcheen (1991) - Rajan's father
Khule-Aam (1992)
Bol Radha Bol (1992) - Police Commissioner
Humshakal (1992) - Jail Warden
Bekhudi (1992)
Deedar (1992) - Air Force Officer Sabharwal
Sone Ki Zanjeer (1992) - Doctor
Apradhi (1992) - The Judge
Naseebwaala (1992)
Lambu Dada (1992) - Senior Police Inspector (uncredited)
Insaniyat Ke Devta (1993) - The Judge
Badi Bahen (1993) - Dr. Srivastav
Dil Tera Aashiq (1993) - Police Inspector (uncredited)
Baarish (1993)
Veerta (1993) - Amar's Advisor
Mohabbat Ki Arzoo (1994) - Police Commissioner
Vaade Iraade (1994) - Chunnibai (Film Producer)
Meri Biwi Ka Jawab Nahin (1994) - DIG
Zakhmi Sipahi (1995) - Inspector
Bewafa Sanam (1995) - Police Commissioner
Jagannath (1996) - Mohan Sinha
Muqadama (1996) - Jailer
Dushman Duniya Ka (1996) - Police Inspector
Aakhri Sanghursh (1997)
Kasam (2001) - Senior Police Officer

References

External links

Indian male film actors
1928 births
2013 deaths
Male actors in Hindi cinema
Male actors in Punjabi cinema
People from Sargodha District
20th-century Indian male actors
Deaths from respiratory failure